Winthrop is a surname.

People with the surname
Notable persons with that surname include:
 Beekman Winthrop (1874–1940), New York lawyer and Governor of Puerto Rico
 Clara Winthrop (1876–after 1935), American philanthropist
 Egerton Leigh Winthrop (1838-1916), American lawyer and clubman who was prominent in New York society during the Gilded Age
 Fitz-John Winthrop (1637-1707), American governor of the Colony of Connecticut from 1698 until his death
 Frederic Bronson Winthrop (1863-1944), American philanthropist and lawyer who was prominent in New York society during the Gilded Age
 John Winthrop (–1649), English-born founding governor of the Massachusetts Bay Colony
 John Winthrop, the Younger (1606–1676), English-born governor of Connecticut
 John Winthrop (1714–1779), American astronomer and professor at Harvard College
 Robert Winthrop (1764-1832), American Royal Navy Vice Admiral
 Robert Charles Winthrop (1809–1894), American lawyer and philanthropist
 Theodore Winthrop (1828–1861), American writer, lawyer, and world traveler
 Thomas L. Winthrop (1760–1841), American Lieutenant Governor of Massachusetts
 Waitstill Winthrop (1641/2-1717), American colonial magistrate, military officer, and politician of New England

Fictional characters
 Eliza Winthrop, the main character in Nancy Garden's Annie on My Mind (1982)
 Ethan Winthrop, a character on the daytime drama Passions
 Franklin Winthrop, a character in the HBO series Oz
 Ivy Winthrop, a character on the daytime drama Passions
 Jane Winthrop, a character on the daytime drama Passions
 Louis Winthorpe III, a character from the movie Trading Places played by Dan Aykroyd
 Sarah Winthrop, a character on the daytime drama Passions
 Wilhelmina "Billy" Hunnewell Winthrop, the main in Judith Krantz's bestselling novels Scruples and Scruples Two, stepmother to the main character of Lovers, Gigi Orsini

See also
Winthrop

de:Winthrop